Dąbrówka Dolna is a village in the administrative district of Gmina Pokój, Namysłów County, Opole Voivodeship, Poland.

References

Villages in Namysłów County